Horsenden is a hamlet in Wycombe district, Buckinghamshire, England and is in the civil parish of Longwick-cum-Ilmer.  It is approximately one mile West of Princes Risborough, seven miles south of Aylesbury and three miles south-west of Chinnor in Oxfordshire.  The Icknield Way passes just to the north of the village from north-east to south-west, although there is no connecting road through the hamlet itself.

Name
The name Horsenden is from the Anglo Saxon Horsan-dun and means 'Horsa's hill or valley'. Horsa was one of the first Anglo Saxon settlers of Britain, who settled in Kent in the Fifth century. The association of the area to Horsa is unknown.

History
After the Norman Conquest the land was in the possession of the Count of Mortain. After 1215 it was passed to Robert de Braybrook. Sir John Donne then acquired the estates in 1480. Horsenden House as it was then known was garrisoned during the English Civil War for Charles I by the Royalist Sir John Denham who managed to maintain possession after the Restoration. 

During the 18th and 19th century there were a number of owners and the House slipped into neglect. In 1810, the House was restored and rebuilt and sometime later renamed Horsenden Manor.  

At the height of The Blitz during the Second World War, the insurance company Norwich Union moved their offices from Piccadilly, Fleet Street and St James' into the Manor but after the war they moved back to their London offices. 

Jamiroquai vocalist Jay Kay has owned Horsenden Manor since 1995 and has a recording studio, granary and garages for his top-end car collection. In 2020, Kay submitted planning applications to Wycombe District Council for a 'kitchen/breakfast area, that is better suited to a family house this size.'  

The parish church is dedicated to St Michael and All Angels. The church has sat on the same site since 1210, however part of the building is 15th century at its eldest. In 1765, the nave and west tower were demolished and the current tower was built, it still contains its original bell dated 1582 and in the late 19th century the chancel was extended 8 feet to the east. 

The hamlet has its own tennis club, and on the same site can be found Princes Risborough's football and cricket teams.

References

External links
 
 Horsenden Church

Hamlets in Buckinghamshire